Lomaridium is a genus of ferns in the family Blechnaceae, subfamily Blechnoideae, according to the Pteridophyte Phylogeny Group classification of 2016 (PPG I). The genus is accepted in a 2016 classification of the family Blechnaceae, but other sources sink it into a very broadly defined Blechnum, equivalent to the whole of the PPG I subfamily.

Species
, using the PPG I classification system, the Checklist of Ferns and Lycophytes of the World accepted the following species:

Lomaridium acutum (Desv.) Gasper & V.A.O.Dittrich
Lomaridium attenuatum (Sw.) Gasper & V.A.O.Dittrich
Lomaridium biforme (Baker) Gasper & V.A.O.Dittrich
Lomaridium binervatum (Poir.) Gasper & V.A.O.Dittrich
Lomaridium bonapartei (Rakotondr.) Gasper & V.A.O.Dittrich
Lomaridium contiguum (Mett.) Gasper & V.A.O.Dittrich
Lomaridium dendrophilum (Sodiro) Gasper & V.A.O.Dittrich
Lomaridium ensiforme (Liebm.) Gasper & V.A.O.Dittrich
Lomaridium fragile (Liebm.) Gasper & V.A.O.Dittrich
Lomaridium fuscosquamosum (A.Rojas) Gasper & V.A.O.Dittrich
Lomaridium nigrocostatum (A.Rojas) Gasper & V.A.O.Dittrich
Lomaridium pteropus (Kunze) Gasper & V.A.O.Dittrich
Lomaridium schottii (Colla) Gasper & V.A.O.Dittrich
Lomaridium simillimum (Baker) Gasper & V.A.O.Dittrich
Lomaridium xiphophyllum (Baker) Gasper & V.A.O.Dittrich

References

Blechnaceae
Fern genera